Paratrachichthys trailli, the sandpaper fish, is a slimehead belonging to the family Trachichthyidae, found in southern Australia and southern New Zealand at depths between .

References

trailli
Fish described in 1875
Taxa named by Frederick Hutton (scientist)
Fish of Australia
Fish of the Pacific Ocean
Marine fish of New Zealand